Livings is a surname of English origin. People with that name include:

 Henry Livings (1929–1998), English playwright and screenwriter
 Martin Livings (born 1970), Australian author
 Nate Livings (born 1982), American football guard

See also
 Hard Livings (gang), Cape Town, South Africa
 Living (disambiguation)
 

Surnames of English origin